Edward Craig Stuart (1827 – 15 March 1911) was the second Anglican Bishop of Waiapu, whose episcopate spanned a 16-year period during the second half of the 19th century.

He was born in Edinburgh, the son of Alexander Stuart and Mary McKnight. He was educated at Trinity College, Dublin, and ordained in 1850. With his great friend Valpy French Stuart worked in India as a CMS missionary for 21 years, first at Agra and latterly (until his appointment to the episcopate) at Jalalpur. In 1874 he went to New Zealand for his health. In 1876 he was appointed as Bishop of Waiapu and he was consecrated on 9 December 1877. On 31 January 1894 he resigned and his last calling was as a CMS missionary in Julfa, Ispahan, Persia, for 15 years from 1894. He died on 15 March 1911, having at some point become a Doctor of Divinity (DD).

References

1827 births
Clergy from Edinburgh
Alumni of Trinity College Dublin
Anglican bishops of Waiapu
19th-century Anglican bishops in New Zealand
1911 deaths
Scottish emigrants to New Zealand
Scottish Episcopalian clergy
Scottish Anglican missionaries
Anglican missionaries in Iran
Anglican missionaries in India
British expatriates in Iran